The 2019–20 Liga III was the 4th season, since its introduction in 2016, of the third level women's football league of the Romanian football league system. The number of starting teams in Liga III increased from 18 to 19. Therefore, 19 teams divided in 4 series (of 4 or 5 teams) were to play in the competition that consists of a double round-robin lasting 6 or 10 stages, totalling 72 matches. Since one team withdrew before the start of the competition, the total number of matches to be played became 64. However, only 44 games were played until the season was frozen due to the 2019-20 coronavirus pandemic.

Team changes

To Liga III
Relegated to Liga III
 Viitorul Reghin (4th place in the 2018–19 Liga II, Seria I, decided to enroll in Liga III)
 Măgura 2012 Bacău (8th place in the 2018–19 Liga II, Seria II, decided to enroll in Liga III)

New founded teams
 FCM Târgoviște
 Politehnica Timişoara
 Viitorul Arad
 Colţea 1920 Braşov
 Măgura Cisnădie
Student Sport Alba Iulia

From Liga III
Promoted to Liga II
 Carmen București (winners of 2018–19 Liga III, Seria I)
 CN Nicu Gane Fălticeni (winners of 2018–19 Liga III, Seria II)
 CSM Târgu Mureș (winners of 2018–19 Liga III, Seria III)
 ACS Atletic Drobeta-Turnu-Severin (runners-up of 2018–19 Liga III, Seria I)

Disbanded
 FC Onești
 Independența 2 Baia Mare
 Sporting Lugaș 2

Excluded and spared teams
Viitorul Reghin requested to be enrolled in Liga III for the 2019–20 season, so Măgura 2012 Bacău (8th place in 2018–19 Liga II, Seria I) was to be spared from relegation to Liga III, due to lack of teams. However, Măgura 2012 Bacău decided to play in Liga III anyway. Due to this vacated spot, ACS Atletic Drobeta-Turnu-Severin was promoted to Liga II.

Stadiums by capacity and location

Seria I

Seria II

Seria III

Seria IV

Seria I Season results

Seria I League table

Seria I Results

Seria II Season results

Seria II League table

Seria II Results

Seria III Season results

Seria III League table

Seria III Results

Seria IV Season results

Seria IV League table

Seria IV Results

References

External links
 Official site

Rom
Fem
Women's football in Romania